The Rabobank Bestuurscentrum or Rabotoren (English: Rabobank Executive Centre or Rabotower) is a skyscraper in the Dutch city of Utrecht, built between 2007 and 2011 and designed by the architectural firm . At , it is the highest office building in the city, and the second highest building overall after the Dom Tower.

References

External links

Buildings and structures in Utrecht (city)
Towers in Utrecht (province)
Skyscraper office buildings in the Netherlands